Paolo Bacchini (born 16 August 1985) is an Italian former competitive figure skater. He is the 2007 and 2012 Merano Cup champion, 2008 Triglav Trophy champion, and a twelve-time Italian national medalist (2002–2013).

Bacchini represented Italy at the 2010 Winter Olympics where he placed 20th in the men's event. In 2011, Bacchini joined Fiamme Oro, the sports category of the Italian police.

He is coached by Peter Grütter and his choreographers have included Raffaella Cazzaniga, Corrado Giordani, Salomé Brunner, and Stéphane Lambiel.

Programs

Results
GP: Grand Prix; JGP: Junior Grand Prix

References

External links
 

Italian male single skaters
Figure skaters at the 2007 Winter Universiade
1985 births
Living people
Figure skaters from Milan
Figure skaters at the 2010 Winter Olympics
Olympic figure skaters of Italy
Figure skaters of Fiamme Oro
Competitors at the 2011 Winter Universiade
Competitors at the 2009 Winter Universiade
Competitors at the 2013 Winter Universiade